The 1962 Far East Circuit was the inaugural season of golf tournaments that comprised the Far East Circuit, later known as the Asia Golf Circuit.

The circuit consisted of five tournaments over five weeks, and was formed from the existing national open championships of the Philippines, Hong Kong and Singapore, along with the inaugural national open championship of Malaysia and the Yomiuri Shimbun sponsored Yomiuri International in Japan. There was a total prize fund of just over M$200,000, which included a bonus pool sponsored by Seagram of M$15,000 for the overall circuit prize.

Golfers from around the world participated in the tour, including some of the biggest names in Australian golf, and it was one of them, multiple Open Championship winner, Peter Thomson, who emerged as the circuit's first champion.

Schedule
The table below shows the 1962 Far East Circuit schedule.

Final standings
For its inaugural season only, the Far East Circuit standings were based on the aggregate strokes taken in all five events. There was a circuit prize of M$15,000 sponsored by Seagram, that was divided amongst the four leading players.

References

Far East Circuit
Asia Golf Circuit